Serena Hotels is a hospitality company which operates up-scale hotels and resorts in East Africa, Southern Africa and South Asia.

Serena comprises a collection of 36 luxury resorts, safari lodges, and hotels, which are located in East Africa (Kenya, Tanzania, Rwanda, Uganda, and Mozambique) and Central and South Asia (Pakistan, Afghanistan, and Tajikistan).

The Serena Hotels Group trades under the name  Tourism Promotion Services (TPS Serena). The company is listed on the Nairobi Stock Exchange (NSE), where it trades under the symbol TPS. The largest shareholder (45%) is the Aga Khan Fund for Economic Development (AKFED), with a further 4% owned by the Aga Khan University Foundation.  , the group has 25 properties in Africa, in the countries of Kenya, Mozambique, Rwanda, Tanzania, and Uganda. The Group also maintains 13 properties in three Asian countries of Afghanistan, Pakistan, and Tajikistan.

In September 2020, Serena Hotels opened a new property in Goma, the capital of North Kivu province in eastern DRC. The five-star Goma Serena Hotel is located at the lakefront of Lake Kivu.

Among its prominent hotels in an already unsafe city by European standards, which was fatally attacked in and at the car park.

Awards 

World Travel Awards (WTA)

 2008,2014,2015,2016,2017,2018,2019,2020,2021: Pakistan’s Leading Hotel (Islamabad Serena Hotel)
 2014,2015,2016,2017,2019,2020,2021: Pakistan’s Leading Hotel Suite (Presidential Suite @ Islamabad Serena Hotel)
 2014,2015,2016,2017,2018,2019,2020,2021: Afghanistan’s Leading Hotel (Kabul Serena Hotel)
 2015,2016,2017,2018,2019,2020,2021: Tajikistan’s Leading Hotel (Dushanbe Serena Hotel)
 2008,2009,2015,2016: Africa's Leading Green Hotel (Nairobi Serena Hotel)
 2005,2009,2015: Kenya's Leading Hotel (Nairobi Serena Hotel)
 2012,2013,2014,2015,2016,2017,2019,2020,2021: Rwanda's Leading Hotel (Kigali Serena Hotel)
 2017,2020,2021: Rwanda's Leading Hotel Suite (Presidential Suite @ Kigali Serena Hotel)
 2016,2017: Zanzibar's Leading Hotel (Zanzibar Serena Hotel)
 2012,2013,2014,2015,2016,2017,2018,2019,2020,2021: Uganda's Leading Hotel (Kampala Serena Hotel)
 2014,2015,2018,2019: Uganda's Leading Hotel Suite (Presidential Suite @ Lake Victoria Serena Resort & SPA)
 2016,2017: Uganda's Leading Hotel Suite (Presidential Suite @ Lake Victoria Serena Resort)
 2020,2021: Uganda's Leading Hotel Suite (Royal Suite @ Kampala Serena Hotel)
 2004,2005,2006,2015,2016,2017,2019,2020,2021: Mozambique's Leading Hotel (Polana Serena Hotel)
 2014,2016,2017,2018,2019,2020,2021: Mozambique's Leading Hotel Suite (Presidential Suite @ Polana Serena Hotel)

See also
 Aga Khan Development Network

References

External link

1970s establishments in Kenya
Companies based in Nairobi
Companies listed on the Nairobi Securities Exchange
Hotel chains
Hotels in Kenya
Hotels in Pakistan